Renew Europe (Renew) is a liberal, pro-European political group of the European Parliament founded for the ninth European Parliament term. The group is the successor to the Alliance of Liberals and Democrats for Europe (ALDE) group which existed during the sixth, seventh and eighth terms from 2004 to 2019. Renew Europe in the European Committee of the Regions is the sister group of Renew Europe.

History
In May 2019, speaking at a debate leading up to the 2019 European Parliament election, Guy Verhofstadt, president of the Alliance of Liberals and Democrats for Europe (ALDE) group, announced that, following the election, the ALDE Group intended to dissolve and form a new alliance with French President Emmanuel Macron's "Renaissance" electoral list. During and following the European elections, the group temporarily styled itself "ALDE plus Renaissance plus USR PLUS".

The new group announced the adoption of its name on 12 June 2019 after it formed an alliance with La République En Marche!. En Marche wanted to avoid the word liberal in the name, though the group continues to also be referred to as the Liberal Group outside of France.

On 19 June 2019, it was announced that Dacian Cioloș, former Prime Minister of Romania and European Commissioner for Agriculture and Rural Development, had been chosen as the group's inaugural chairman, defeating Sophie in 't Veld by 64 votes to 42 and thus becoming the first Romanian to become the leader of a European Parliamentary group. In October 2021, Cioloș resigned to return to domestic politics in Romania.

MEPs

9th European Parliament

Former members 

 The UK MEPs of the Liberal Democrats and the Alliance Party de facto left the group on 31 January 2020 when the UK left the EU.

 On 20 January 2021, the Renew Europe Group terminated the membership of Viktor Uspaskich, MEP of the Lithuanian Labour Party.
 In March 2021, Czech MEP Radka Maxová left the Renew Europe group because of disagreement with ANO 2011.

Resignation and replacement 
 Fredrick Federley, MEP of the Swedish Centre Party, resigned on 11 December 2020 from all politics immediately.
 In August 2022, Søren Gade, MEP from Venstre, announced that he would stand in the upcoming general election. It was later announced that Bergur Løkke Rasmussen would replace him in the European Parliament. On March 13 2023, he announced that he would switch his party affiliation to the Moderates.

New members 
 In February 2020, Nicola Danti leaves the S&D group and joins Renew Europe.
 In March 2021, Marco Zullo, elected among the Five Star Movement (independent) leaves his party and joins Renew Europe.
 In May 2021, Lucia Nicholsonová, from Slovakia, then Independent at the national level but having been part of the European Conservatives and Reformists, leaves this group and joins Renew Europe.
 On November 10, 2021, Renew Europe's president Stéphane Séjourné announces that the Polish political party Poland 2050 has joined Renew Europe, leading to Róża Thun joining the group.
 On November 17, 2021, Carlo Calenda joins Renew Europe following the accession of his party, Azione. Renew Europe reaches 100 MEPs.
 On December 7, 2021, Michal Wiezik leaves the EPP and joins Renew Europe following his transfer to Progressive Slovakia.
 On March 8, 2022, Salima Yenbou, a French MEP from Europe Ecology – The Greens, leaves The Greens and joins Renew Europe after endorsing Emmanuel Macron in the run-up to the French presidential election.
 On May 4, 2022, Greek MEP Giorgos Kyrtsos leaves the EPP and joins Renew Europe.

Leadership
President:  Stéphane Séjourné
First Vice-President:  Malik Azmani
Vice-Presidents:  Sylvie Brunet,  Katalin Cseh,  Jordi Cañas Pérez,  Morten Løkkegaard,  Iskra Mihaylova,  Frédérique Ries,  Dominique Riquet,   Michal Šimečka
Secretary General: Anders Rasmussen

International cooperation
On 21 January 2022, representatives of Renew Europe held a meeting with the European Party of Armenia.

References

External links
 
 Renew Europe on Facebook
 Renew Europe on Twitter
 Negotiations with USR Plus
 Renew Europe in the European Committee of the Regions

2019 establishments in the European Union
Alliance of Liberals and Democrats for Europe
Alliance of Liberals and Democrats for Europe MEPs
European Parliament party groups